Gold Star, Goldstar, or similar may refer to:

Art, entertainment, and media

Fictional characters
 Goldstar (comics), the name of several fictional characters from DC Comics
 Commissioner Goldstar, a major character in Fresh Beat Band of Spies

Awards and decorations
 Hero of the Soviet Union, a medal awarded as a gold star
 Hero of the Russian Federation, the medal succeeding the aforementioned Soviet medal, also awarded as a gold star
 Gold Star Order, awarded in Vietnam
 Gold Star Service Banner, United States service flag for family of members who died during military service
 Gold 5/16 inch star, a United States ribbon device indicating an additional award

Music industry
 Gold Star Records, record label issued by the Quinn Recording Company of Houston, Texas, in the mid-20th century
 Gold Star Studios, major independent recording studio located in Los Angeles, California

Brands and enterprises
 BSA Gold Star, 500 cc 4-stroke production motorcycle
 Gold Star Chili, restaurant located in Cincinnati, Ohio known for serving Cincinnati-style chili
 Goldstar (beer), an Israeli brand of beer
 GoldStar, former Korean electronics company and predecessor to LG Electronics (which still uses the name as a budget brand in the US)
 Goldstar Events, an online discount ticket retailer for entertainment events
 Goldstar shoes, a Nepali shoe brand

Sports
 Confederation of Australian Motor Sport (CAMS) Gold Star, awarded to the winner of the Australian Drivers' Championship, the country's premier open wheel motor racing series
 Kinboshi or Gold Star, awarded in the sport of Sumo to any Maegashira-level wrestler who defeats any of the top-ranked Yokozuna in a bout
 Gold Star, a former name of the defunct Nippon Professional Baseball team, the Daiei Stars

Other uses
 Gold star (slang), any of the LGBT slang terms gold star gay, gold star lesbian and gold star asexual
 Gold Star Bridge, a pair of steel truss bridges located in New London, Connecticut, U.S.
 American Gold Star Mothers, a nonprofit organization

See also
 Bronze Star
 Gold (disambiguation)
 Gold Award (disambiguation)
 Gold medal (disambiguation)
 Silver Star (disambiguation)
 Star (disambiguation)